Gabion was one of 10 s built for the French Navy in the first decade of the 20th century.

References

Bibliography

 

Branlebas-class destroyers
Ships built in France
1907 ships